Page Hamilton is an American singer and guitarist, best recognized as the frontman for the alternative metal band Helmet.

Solo albums

Studio albums

Band of Susans

Studio albums

Compilation albums

Extended plays

Singles

Helmet

Studio albums

Compilation albums

Singles

Performance credits

References

External links
 

Discographies of American artists
Rock music discographies